The Robert Award for Best Children's Film is one of the merit awards presented by the Danish Film Academy at the annual Robert Awards ceremony. The award has been handed out since 2002.

Honorees

2000s 
 2002: Min søsters børn – Tomas Villum Jensen
 2003: Klatretøsen – 
 2004:  – Anders Gustafsson
 2005: Terkel in Trouble – Stefan Fjeldmark, Kresten Vestbjerg Andersen & Thorbjørn Christoffersen
 2006: Strings – Anders Rønnow Klarlund
 2007: Supervoksen – Christina Rosendahl
 2008: Island of Lost Souls – Nikolaj Arcel
 2009: Max Pinlig –

2010s 
 2010:  – Birger Larsen
 2011: Hold om mig – Kaspar Munk
 2012: Rebounce – 
 2013: You & Me Forever – Kaspar Munk
 2014:  – 
 2015:  – 
 2016: The Shamer's Daughter – 
 2017: In the Blood – Rasmus Heisterberg
 2018: The Incredible Story of the Giant Pear – 
 2019: Checkered Ninja – Anders Matthesen

2020s 
 2020:  –  &

References

External links 
  

2002 establishments in Denmark
Awards established in 2002
Awards for best film
Children's Film